Sinai commonly refers to:

 Sinai Peninsula, Egypt
 Mount Sinai, a mountain in the Sinai Peninsula, Egypt
 Biblical Mount Sinai, the site in the Bible where Moses received the Law of God

Sinai may also refer to:

 Sinai, South Dakota, a place in the United States
 Sinai (surname), including a list of people and fictional characters with the name
 Sinai (Noguchi), a sculpture by Isamu Noguchi
 Sinai, a game by SPI
 Sinai, a 19th-century monthly Jewish magazine in German by David Einhorn
 Sinai School, a Jewish primary school in London, England
Sinai, one of two tram cars on the Angels Flight funicular in Los Angeles, U.S.

See also 

 Mount Sinai (disambiguation)
 Temple Sinai (disambiguation)
 Sinai Hospital (disambiguation)
 Saini, a caste of North India
 Shenoy, a surname sometime written as "Sinai" in Goa, India
 Siani (disambiguation)
 Sin (mythology)
 Sina (disambiguation)
 Sinnai, a place in Sardinia